The Lieutenant is an American television series, the first created by Gene Roddenberry. It aired on NBC on Saturday evenings in the 1963–1964 television schedule. It was produced by Arena Productions, one of Metro-Goldwyn-Mayer's most successful in-house production companies of the 1960s. Situated at Camp Pendleton, Southern California, the West Coast base of the U.S. Marine Corps, The Lieutenant focuses on the men of the Corps in peacetime with a Cold War backdrop. The title character is Second Lieutenant William Tiberius Rice, a rifle platoon leader and one of the training instructors at Camp Pendleton. An hour-long drama, The Lieutenant explores the lives of enlisted Marines and officers alike.

The series was known for hosting a plethora of stars and guest stars who would later appear in Roddenberry's more well known work, Star Trek.  Rice himself—whose middle name was also shared by the character James T. Kirk—was played by Gary Lockwood, who appeared in the second Star Trek pilot "Where No Man Has Gone Before".  Majel Barrett, Leonard Nimoy, Nichelle Nichols, and Walter Koenig all appeared as guest stars, along with Ricardo Montalbán—famous for his portrayal as Khan Noonien Singh— and Paul Comi, from the Star Trek episode "Balance of Terror".  Several other prominent stars can be seen in various other episodes, such as Rip Torn—playing a drill instructor, Ted Knight playing a yeoman, veteran actor James Gregory as a senior Marine NCO, Alice star Vic Tayback as a Marine Corps sentry, and veteran character actor Denver Pyle—later internationally known as Uncle Jesse from The Dukes of Hazzard—appeared in the series as a Marine Corps major.

The series was released on DVD in two half-season sets by the Warner Archive Collection on August 14, 2012.

Synopsis
Gary Lockwood starred as USMC second lieutenant William Tiberius Rice, a recent graduate of the United States Naval Academy who is assigned his first command, that of a rifle platoon. Rice is a young, educated idealist who still has much to learn from an older mentor. Robert Vaughn played Captain Raymond Rambridge, Rice's company commander, an up-from-the-ranks officer. Richard Anderson, remembered for playing Oscar Goldman in The Six Million Dollar Man and The Bionic Woman, had a recurring role as battalion commander Lieutenant Colonel Steve Hiland, and Linda Evans, later known for her roles on The Big Valley and as Krystle Carrington in Dynasty, appeared in several early episodes as Colonel Hiland's daughter Nan, who flirted with Rice.  The series focused primarily on Rice's various assignments as a junior officer, which often involved special details or difficult situations.  Several of the later episodes featured Rice becoming an undercover investigator with military intelligence, allowing for plots and scenarios which Rice would otherwise not be involved with as a second lieutenant.

Production and broadcast

After its original broadcast, The Lieutenant was sparsely rerun in syndication, as its run had not been long enough for episodes to be stripped in daily broadcasts. In 2016, digital subchannel network GetTV aired The Lieutenant on Wednesday evenings at 8 p.m. Eastern Time in a block of four episodes, not following the original airdate order.

Unbroadcast episode rumors
The installment "To Set It Right", which was written by Lee Erwin, was about racial prejudice, and featured Nichelle Nichols as the fiancée of a black Marine, portrayed by Don Marshall, with Dennis Hopper as the antagonist to that Marine. Some aver that the episode was never broadcast. However, multiple newspapers from the time indicate that it was to be shown on February 22, 1964, at least in some markets, including ones in the South Moreover, Variety ran a review of the episode on February 24, 1964 

The Paley Center for Media in New York City possesses a videotape of the episode. This episode was eventually broadcast on the cable channel TNT in the early 1990s.

After The Lieutenant
The Lieutenant was canceled after only one season.

Roddenberry recruited Lockwood one more time, in "Where No Man Has Gone Before," the second pilot installment for Star Trek, as Lieutenant Commander Gary Mitchell.

The title character in The Lieutenant was Second Lieutenant William Tiberius Rice; on the original series of Star Trek, the title character was James T. Kirk. It was not until the "Star Trek: The Animated Series" episode "BEM" that "Tiberius" was revealed as Captain Kirk's middle name.

The DVD release of The Lieutenant - The Complete Series, Part 2 includes a feature film version of the episode "To Kill a Man" that was released in international markets.

Cast members

Regulars
Gary Lockwood – Second Lieutenant William Tiberius Rice
Robert Vaughn – Captain Raymond Rambridge
John Milford – Sergeant Kagey
Henry Beckman – Major Al Barker
Richard Anderson – Lieutenant Colonel Steve Hiland 
Don Penny – Lieutenant Harris
Chuck Haren – Corporal Sandow
Carmen Phillips – Lily
Steve Franken – Lieutenant Samwell 'Sanpan' Panosian 
Chris Noel – the regular female cast member, who never had a regular "character;" Gene Roddenberry had her acting out different characters each week

Robert Vaughn
Vaughn received the same compensation as Lockwood, even though he was usually in only one scene per episode. Vaughn asked both MGM Television and Norman Felton (under whose Arena Productions banner The Lieutenant was being produced) for his own series during the run of The Lieutenant. The result was The Man from U.N.C.L.E., which began the next season and proved to be highly successful.

Guest stars
Guest stars included Eddie Albert, Jack Albertson, Edward Asner, Barbara Babcock, Barbara Bain, Ina Balin, and Majel Barrett, who later became Roddenberry's wife. There were also Marian Collier, Russ Conway, Dennis Cross, Robert Karnes, Paul Newlan, Gregg Palmer, Joe Ploski, Penny Santon, Tom Simcox, Ray Teal and Kelly Thordsen.

Episodes

References

External links
 

1963 American television series debuts
1964 American television series endings
American military television series
Black-and-white American television shows
NBC original programming
Television shows about the United States Marine Corps
Television series by MGM Television
Television series created by Gene Roddenberry
Television shows set in California